The RIAI Travelling Scholarship is an award made annually by the Royal Institute of the Architects of Ireland to one or more students of architecture attending a school of architecture in the Republic of Ireland or Northern Ireland.

The award has been made annually since 1935 and has former the basis for the careers of many notable Irish architects, among them Arthur Gibney, Sam Stephenson and Trevor Leaker.

Over the course of its history, the scholarship has been competed for in numerous ways. Current practice is for the RIAI to set a competition brief, which is then the subject of the design of a building or landscape by the competitors. An appointed jury of distinguished and learned architects and pedagogues then selects the winning entry.

References 

RIAI

RIAI Travelling Scholarship
Architecture awards